Nicholas Edward Nelson Tooth (7 September 1844 – 17 August 1913) was a foundry owner and member of the Queensland Legislative Assembly.

Early days
Tooth was born at Sydney to John Tooth and his wife Elizabeth (née Newnham) and was educated at Castle's private school in Calder House, Sydney. He began his working career as a clerk with the Bank of New South Wales before unsuccessfully trying his hand at pastoral pursuits at Widgee Station. He then leased Kolan Station and was a stock-drover before becoming an agent and auctioneer in Maryborough.

For two years he was a farmer in Maryborough before joining Walkers Foundry as a clerk. He then became a senior partner at the Vulcan Foundry in Maryborough.

Political career
After serving as an alderman in Maryborough including four stints as mayor in 1880–81, 1885–86, 1889, and 1891 he stood for the seat of Burrum in the Queensland Legislative Assembly in 1893, defeating the Labour candidate, Mr J Willard. He went on to hold the seat until 1902 when he was defeated by George Martin of the Labour Party.

Personal life
On the 14 April 1868, Tooth married Charlotte Thomson (died 1940) and together had four sons and four daughters.

He was a Major in the Wide Bay and Burnett Infantry Regiment, a member of the Protestant Alliance Friendly Society, and was also a member of the Chamber of Commerce, the Hospital Board, the School of Arts, and the Pastoral and Agricultural Society.

Tooth died in 1913 and was buried in the Maryborough Cemetery.

References

Members of the Queensland Legislative Assembly
1844 births
1913 deaths
19th-century Australian politicians
20th-century Australian politicians
Politicians from Sydney
Foundrymen
Australian stock and station agents
19th-century Australian businesspeople